This is a list of online databases that publish funding opportunities.

 Australian Directory of Philanthropy, Philanthropy Australia
 Canada Business Network, Canadian federal government grants, loans and financing programs
 ProQuest Pivot (formerly Community of Science Funding Opportunities), ProQuest
 Dialog OnDisc Grants Database, Dialog OnDisc
 FC Search, Foundation Center, replaced by Foundation Directory Online
 Federal Assistance Program Retrieval System (FAPRS)
 Federal Information Exchange (FEDIX), merged with RAMS
 Federal Research in Progress (FEDRIP), National Technical Information Service
 Fundica.com, private sector and public sector funding for Canadian businesses
 Grants.gov, U.S. federal government grants
 GrantGopher.com, grants for U.S.-based nonprofit organizations
 GrantSearch, Australian grants, scholarships and funding opportunities for all sectors
 GrantSelect
 GrantScape, Catalog of Federal Domestic Assistance
 GrantSelect, American Association of State Colleges and Universities
 Illinois Researcher Information Service (IRIS)
 Research Professional, Research Limited
 SciVal Funding, Elsevier
 Sponsored Programs Information Network (SPIN), InfoEd
 The Funding Portal, public sector funding for Canadian businesses, nonprofit organizations and academia
 World Academy of Young Scientists
 1DANA Portal, public funding platform for Researchers, Entrepreneurs, Academia, Industry for Malaysia by Agensi Inovasi Malaysia

Research-related lists
Online databases
Database-related lists